The 2014 Seattle Sounders FC season was the club's sixth season in Major League Soccer, the United States' top-tier of professional soccer. Including previous Seattle Sounders franchises, this was the 34th season of a soccer team playing in the Seattle metro area.

Background 

The Sounders came into the 2014 season following a disappointing 2013, winning no silverware for the second consecutive season. The off season saw higher than usual turnover and transfers amid reports of locker room tension.

Review

Roster 
Major League Soccer teams are limited to eight players without U.S. citizenship, a permanent resident (green card holder), or the holder of other special status (e.g., refugee or asylum status). These international roster slots can be traded.

Competitions

Preseason

Carolina Challenge Cup

MLS regular season

Standings

Western Conference

Overall table 
Note: the table below has no impact on playoff qualification and is used solely for determining host of the MLS Cup, certain CCL spots, and 2015 MLS draft. The conference tables are the sole determinant for teams qualifying to the playoffs

Results summary

Results by round

Match results

MLS Cup Playoffs

Conference semifinals

Conference finals

U.S. Open Cup

Friendlies

Statistics

Appearances 

Numbers outside parentheses denote appearances as starter.
Numbers in parentheses denote appearances as substitute.
Players with no appearances are not included in the list.

Goals and assists

Disciplinary record

Additional suspensions 

Clint Dempsey was suspended for two matches by the MLS Disciplinary Committee for "violent conduct" during the home match against Toronto FC on March 15, 2014. He was eligible to return for the away match against Portland Timbers on April 5, 2014.

Transfers 
The 2013-2014 offseason was a very active one for Sounders FC, especially compared to years past and to other teams in MLS. For transfers in, dates listed are when Sounders FC officially signed the players to the roster. Transactions where only the rights to the players are acquired are not listed. For transfers out, dates listed are when Sounders FC officially removed the players from its roster, not when they signed with another club. If a player later signed with another club, his new club will be noted, but the date listed here remains the one when he was officially removed from Sounders FC roster.

In 

Seattle Sounders FC's 2013-2014 winter included bringing in several new faces to further supplement the returning core. Forward Kenny Cooper (trade with FC Dallas for Adam Moffat), midfielder Marco Pappa (acquired through league Allocation Ranking rules), defender Chad Marshall (trade with Columbus Crew for an undisclosed amount allocation money and a third-round draft pick), and goalkeeper Stefan Frei (trade with Toronto FC for a conditional first-round draft pick in the 2015 SuperDraft) are the most high-profile names. These four are expected to step into the first eleven, or at least see significant playing time.

Other players acquired include midfielder Tristan Bowen (trade with Chivas USA for Mauro Rosales), forward Chad Barrett (acquired with thirteenth pick in 2014 MLS Re-Entry Draft), and defender Jalil Anibaba (trade with Chicago Fire for Patrick Ianni and Jhon Kennedy Hurtado).

Seattle also signed Stanford's Aaron Kovar and Wake Forest's Sean Okoli to Homegrown Player contracts. Both players played for Sounders FC's academy team before beginning their respective college careers.

Seattle selected Damion Lowe, Stefano Rijssel, Fabio Pereira, and Jimmy Ockford in the 2014 MLS SuperDraft.

Out 

There were many departures of contributing players during Seattle Sounders FC's 2013-2014 off-season. Most notably, on December 17, 2013, Sounders traded forward Eddie Johnson to D.C. United for allocation money. Other notable off-season departures included midfielders Mauro Rosales (traded to Chivas USA for Tristan Bowen and the second Allocation Ranking for the 2014 season), Steve Zakuani (selected in Re-Entry Draft by Portland Timbers FC), Adam Moffat (traded to FC Dallas in exchange for Kenny Cooper), defenders Marc Burch (selected in Re-Entry Draft by Colorado Rapids), Patrick Ianni and Jhon Kennedy Hurtado (traded to Chicago Fire), and goalkeeper Michael Gspurning (declined contract option).

Less significant departures included Philip Lund and Blair Gavin.

Loan in

Loan out 

During the Winter between the 2013 and 2014 seasons, midfielder Clint Dempsey joined his former club, Fulham FC in England's Premier League, for a two-month loan spell. Because Major League Soccer's season begins in Spring, and the Premier League begins in Fall, Dempsey did not miss any of Sounders' competitive matches, though he was not with the team for pre-season training. During the loan period, Fulham's manager René Meulensteen was replaced by Felix Magath, prompting some concerns from Sounders supporters that Dempsey was not getting the competitive experience that was the purpose for the loan.

Recognition 
MLS Player of the Week

MLS Player of the Month

MLS Goal of the Week

Kits

See also 
 Seattle Sounders FC
 2014 in American soccer
 2014 Major League Soccer season

References 

Seattle Sounders FC seasons
Seattle Sounders Football Club
Seattle Sounders Football Club
2014 in sports in Washington (state)
2014
2014